Javier Lux (born 10 July 1977, in Carcarañá, Santa Fe Province) is a retired Argentine football midfielder. His brother, Germán Lux, is a goalkeeper who has represented Argentina internationally.

Club career
Lux started his career with Racing Club de Avellaneda in 1995. He was part of the squad that won the Apertura tournament in 2001. In 2002, he left to join Talleres de Córdoba spending one season at the club before spending one season each at Estudiantes de La Plata and Instituto de Córdoba.

After a short spell with Club Atlético Banfield in 2006, Lux joined Arsenal de Sarandí where he helped them to qualify for the Copa Libertadores for the first time in their history. Lux then moved down a division to play for Belgrano.

Honours

External links

 Argentine Primera statistics

1977 births
Living people
People from San Lorenzo Department
Argentine footballers
Association football midfielders
Racing Club de Avellaneda footballers
Talleres de Córdoba footballers
Estudiantes de La Plata footballers
Instituto footballers
Club Atlético Banfield footballers
Arsenal de Sarandí footballers
Club Atlético Belgrano footballers
Argentine people of German descent
Sportspeople from Santa Fe Province